Uvas Reservoir is an artificial lake located west of Morgan Hill, California in the United States. The reservoir is surrounded by a  park managed by the Santa Clara County Parks and Recreation Department.  The park provides limited fishing ("catch-and-release"), picnicking, and hiking activities.  Boating is not permitted in the reservoir.

Geography
The reservoir sits atop part of the Franciscan Formation.  A variety of rocks from the formation can be found there, including slate, basalt, marble, and many others.

History
The reservoir was created in 1957 by the construction of the Uvas Dam across Uvas Creek in the southern part of Uvas Valley.  It is the fifth largest reservoir owned by the Santa Clara Valley Water District.

In 2013, the Scoffone family sold  adjacent to the park to the Peninsula Open Space Trust, which doubled the park's size.

See also
List of lakes in California
List of lakes in the San Francisco Bay Area
List of reservoirs and dams in California

References

Reservoirs in Santa Clara County, California
Reservoirs in California
Reservoirs in Northern California